The Blazer is a modern American breed of riding horse, bred particularly for ranch work. It was developed by Neil Hinck of Star, Idaho, from a single foundation stallion named Little Blaze. He bred for intelligence, strength, gentleness, easy gaits and overall suitability for work on a ranch. A breed association, the American Blazer Horse Association, was established in 2006. The Blazer is not listed in the Global Databank for Animal Genetic Resources of the FAO, nor is it reported to DAD-IS.

References

Horse breeds
Horse breeds originating in the United States